Petaline is a quaternary alkaloid that is obtained from the Lebanese plant Leontice leontopetalum (Family: Berberidaceae).

References

Alkaloids found in plants